Ben Wendel is a jazz saxophonist, bassoonist, and pianist who is a founding member of the band Kneebody. He has worked with Snoop Dogg, Ignacio Berroa, Daedelus, Taylor Eigsti, Gerald Clayton, and Tigran Hamasyan.

Career
Wendel was born in Vancouver, British Columbia, Canada and raised in Los Angeles. Highlights include multiple domestic and international tours with artists such as Ignacio Berroa, Tigran Hamasyan, Antonio Sanchez, Gerald Clayton, Eric Harland, Taylor Eigsti, Snoop Dogg, and Prince. Ben is a founding member of  group Kneebody. As a composer, he has received an ASCAP Jazz Composer Award, the 2008 and 2011 Chamber Music America New Works Grant, and the Victor Lynch-Staunton award by the Canada Council for the Arts. He co-wrote the score for John Krasinski's adaptation of David Foster Wallace's "Brief Interviews With Hideous Men". He worked with conductor Kent Nagano in producing concerts for the Festspiel Plus in Munich, Germany.  From 2008 to 2015, he produced a multi-genre performance series at the Broad Stage in Santa Monica, California. During that time he was appointed the head of their Jazz and Blues initiative. As part of this appointment, he helped to create an artistic council which included Quincy Jones, Herb Alpert and Luciana Souza. Wendel has taught jazz at USC and the New School in New York City.

Discography

As leader 
 Simple Song (Sunnyside, 2009)
 Frame (Sunnyside, 2012)
 Small Constructions (Sunnyside, 2013)
 What We Bring (Motema, 2016)
 The Seasons (Motema, 2018)
 High Heart (Edition, 2020)

With Kneebody
 Kneebody (Koch, 2005)
 Low Electrical Worker (Jazz Engine, 2007)
 You Can Have Your Moment (Winter & Winter, 2010)
 The Line (Concord, 2013) – recorded in 2012
 Kneedelus (Brainfeeder, 2016)
 Anti-Hero (Motema, 2017)
 Chapters (Edition, 2019)

As sideman 
With Daedelus
 Invention (Plug Research, 2002)
 Of Snowdonia (Plug Research, 2004)
 Love to Make Music To (Ninja Tune, 2008)

With Tigran Hamasyan
 Red Hail (Plus Loin Music, 2009)
 World Passion (Plus Loin Music, 2009)
 Shadow Theater (Verve, 2013)
 Mockroot (Nonesuch, 2015)

With Adam Rudolph
 Go: Organic Orchestra 1 (Meta, 2002)
 Web of Light (Meta, 2002)

With Todd Sickafoose
 Blood Orange (Secret Hatch, 2006)
 Tiny Resistors (Cryptogramophone, 2008)

With Linda Oh
 Sun Pictures (Greenleaf Music, 2013)
 Walk Against Wind (Biophilia, 2017)

With others
 Christina Aguilera & Cher, Burlesque (RCA, 2010)
 Busdriver, Perfect Hair (Big Dada, 2014)
 Gerald Clayton, Tributary Tales (Motema, 2017)
 Taylor Eigsti, Lucky to Be Me (Concord Jazz, 2006)
 Shane Endsley, 2nd Guess (Endsley Music 2002)
 Joel Harrison, Infinite Possibility (Sunnyside, 2013)
 The Long Lost, The Long Lost (Ninja Tune, 2009)
 Ross McHenry, Nothing Remains Unchanged (First Word 2020)
 Melissa Morgan, Until I Met You (Telarc, 2009)
 Jason Mraz, Waiting for My Rocket to Come (Elektra, 2002)
 Josh Nelson, I Hear a Rhapsody (Steel Bird Music 2009)
 Austin Peralta, Endless Planets (Brainfeeder, 2011)

References

External links 
 Official site 

1976 births
Living people
American jazz musicians
Canadian jazz musicians
Eastman School of Music alumni
Musicians from Santa Monica, California
Musicians from Vancouver
People from Brooklyn
Jazz musicians from New York (state)
Jazz musicians from California
Kneebody members
Motéma Music artists
Concord Records artists
Sunnyside Records artists
Edition Records artists